Purtill is a surname. Notable people with the surname include:

C. Leigh Purtill, American author
Jim Purtill (born 1955), American football coach
Joseph Purtill (1927–2014), American jurist, lawyer and legislator
Kieron Purtill (born 1977), British rugby league player and coach
Maurice Purtill (1916–1994), American swing jazz drummer
Richard Purtill (1931-2016), American Philosophy professor and novelist